The 2010–11 TCU Horned Frogs basketball team represented Texas Christian University. The team was coached by Jim Christian. They played their home games at Daniel–Meyer Coliseum in Fort Worth, Texas and were a member of the Mountain West Conference. They finished the season 11–22, 1–15 in Mountain West play to finish in last place. They lost in the quarterfinals of the Mountain West Basketball tournament to BYU.

Preview 
The Horned Frogs were picked to finish seventh in the Mountain West Conference.

Roster

Schedule and results 

|-
!colspan=9 style=| Exhibition

|-
!colspan=9 style=| Regular season

|-
!colspan=9 style=| Mountain West tournament

References 

TCU
TCU Horned Frogs men's basketball seasons